Mind Over Murder is a 2022 American documentary television miniseries revolving around the Beatrice Six, directed by Nanfu Wang. It consists of 6 episodes and premiered on June 20, 2022, on HBO.

Plot
The series follows the complex story of the Beatrice Six, who were convicted in 1989 of the 1985 rape and murder of Helen Wilson. In 2009, the six were exonerated by DNA evidence, despite five of them originally confessing to the crime when a police psychologist convinced them that they were experiencing repressed memory.

Episodes

Production
After Nanfu Wang completed her first film Hooligan Sparrow, Wang showed the film to the main subject. Realizing some of the subject's memories were not true, Wang found this fascinating. In 2017, Wang read an article about the Beatrice Six, and was intrigued by their story, and wanted to explore it as a filmmaker. Previously the six were approached by other filmmakers to make films or television series, but declined. Wang first traveled to Beatrice in 2019, taking time to build trust within the community, and consulting with the defense attorney who represented the six, once they began to know Wang's intentions, she gained access to those close to the story.

In June 2022, it was announced Wang had directed a documentary series revolving around the Beatrice Six, which HBO Documentary Films and Vox Media Studios produced, and distributed by HBO.

Reception
On the review aggregator website Rotten Tomatoes, the series holds an approval rating of 100%, based on 5 reviews with an average rating of 9.40/10. On Metacritic, it has a score of 88 out of 100, based on 6 reviews, indicating "universal acclaim".

References

External links
 
 

2022 American television series debuts
2020s American documentary television series
2020s American television miniseries
HBO documentary films
HBO original programming